Public Finance Review is a peer-reviewed academic journal that publishes papers four times a year in the fields of business and economics. The journal's editor is T. Scott Findley (Utah State University). It has been in publication since 1973 and is currently published by SAGE Publications.

Scope 
Public Finance Review focuses on the variety of allocation, distribution, and stabilization functions within the public sector economy. The journal is a professional forum devoted to economic research, theory, and policy applications. Public Finance Review aims to publish the most up-to-date information to help policy makers, political scientists, and researchers put policies and research into action.

Abstracting and indexing 
Public Finance Review is abstracted and indexed in the following databases:
 ABI/INFORM
 Academic Onefile
 Business Source Complete
 Business Source Premier
 EconLit
 General Onefile
 SCOPUS

External links 
 

SAGE Publishing academic journals
English-language journals
Finance journals
Publications established in 1973
Public finance